Cefalù or Cefalu may refer to:

 Cefalù, a city and comune in the province of Palermo, Sicily, Italy
 Domenico Cefalù, the boss of the Gambino crime family
 Ernie Cefalu, an American artist